The 2006 St. George Illawarra Dragons season was the eighth in the joint venture club's history. The Dragons competed in the NRL's 2006 premiership season. The team finished sixth in the regular season, making finals but getting knocked out in the preliminary finals against the Melbourne Storm, losing 24–10.

Squad gains and losses

Ladder

Ladder Progression

Season results

References 

St. George Illawarra Dragons
St. George Illawarra Dragons seasons
2006 in rugby league by club